Sun TV may refer to:

 Sun TV (India), an Indian Tamil cable television channel owned by Sun TV Network
 Sun TV Network, the company that owns the Tamil television channel
 Sun TV (Hong Kong), a Mandarin satellite television channel based in Hong Kong
 SUN TV (Turkey), a local TV in Mersin, Turkey
 Sun News Network (2011–2015), a defunct Canadian news and opinion channel, originally proposed under the name "Sun TV News Channel"
 CKXT-TV (2003–2011), a defunct independent television station in Toronto, Canada which used the on-air name SUN TV
 Sun Television, a television station in Hyōgo Prefecture, Japan
 Sun Television and Appliances, a defunct retailer of consumer electronics
 Sun Sports, a Florida sports broadcasting network
 iNews, a private terrestrial television network in Indonesia formerly known as SUN TV
 Lemar TV (Pashto for "Sun TV"), a television station based in Kabul, Afghanistan